Story of Yanxi Palace is a Chinese historical series recounting the struggles of a palace maid in the court of the Qianlong Emperor. It was created by Yu Zheng, with original screenplay written by Zhou Mo, and later developed into a novel by Xiao Lian Mao. Starring Wu Jinyan, Charmaine Sheh, Qin Lan, Nie Yuan, Tan Zhuo and Xu Kai, the series premiered on iQiyi from July 19, 2018 to August 26, 2018. During its run it was streamed more than 15 billion times.

Distributed in more than 70 markets worldwide, Story of Yanxi Palace has become a huge hit, especially in Asia. It was the most Googled TV show in the world in 2018, despite Google being blocked in Mainland China.

A spinoff and sequel to the series, the 6-episode Yanxi Palace: Princess Adventures, aired on Netflix December 31, 2019.

Synopsis
During the Qing Dynasty, in 18th century Beijing, Wei Yingluo enters the court of the Qianlong Emperor, Aisin Gioro Hongli, as one of the palace embroiderers, in order to secretly investigate her beloved sister's mysterious death.

At first believing the imperial guard Fuca Fuheng to be the prime suspect, Yingluo schemes to approach his sister, the Empress Fuca Rongyin, and succeeds in getting transferred from her embroidery unit to the Empress's Changchun Palace as her maid. She learns that the Fuca siblings are innocent of the crime. Yingluo and Fuheng fall for each other.

Meanwhile, Qianlong's Consort Chun allies herself with Empress Fuca because of her crush on her brother.

Yingluo eventually catches the attention of Qianlong himself. Though Yingluo is not noble by birth and is illiterate, Empress Fuca teaches her how to read and write, and the proper etiquette and mannerisms for noblewomen. The empress saves her several times from punishment for probing too deeply into her sister's death. In turn, Yingluo helps Empress Fuca survive a series of maneuvers by her rivals. The two develop a close friendship.

In time, Yingluo discovers that her sister was raped by the son of the late Emperor Yongzheng, half-brother to the current emperor. To cover up the shameful act, the Prince's mother murdered Yingluo's sister. Yingluo successfully hatches a plot to kill the culprit. Empress Fuca feigns anger over Yingluo's defiance and banishes her to the palace's workhouse to allow Yingluo to escape a potentially more severe punishment from the Emperor. There, Yingluo befriends a conniving eunuch, Yuan Chunwang.

Without Yingluo, Empress Fuca falls victim to the machinations of Noble Consort Gao that put her in a coma. News reaches Yingluo, who visits Empress Fuca's chamber to sit by her mistress's side and care for her. Yingluo's devotion to Empress Fuca touches Qianlong even more. His own feelings towards her cause him to forbid Fuheng and Yingluo from marrying. Yingluo persists in her love despite various punishments from the emperor, but Fuheng backs down, causing the two to become distant.

Meanwhile, Consort Xian drives Noble Consort Gao to commit suicide. The emperor eventually relents on his tough stance towards Yingluo and allows her to return as maid to the Empress.

Empress Fuca eventually wakes from her coma and becomes pregnant again. She almost loses her life while giving birth to a son, who is immediately the target of assassination by Consort Chun. Consort Chun, stinging at Fuheng's rejection, strives to be the Emperor's new favorite and even bears a son, placing her in direct competition with the Empress. That New Year's Eve, Noble Consort Chun murders the baby by putting the heating area of Changchun Palace on fire and a devastated Empress Fuca commits suicide out of grief. After her death, Yingluo is sent to live and guard over her mistress's grave at the Old Summer Palace. (episode 40) She stays there with Yuan Chunwang until during an imperial visit by Qianlong and his consorts to Empress Fuca's grave, Yingluo learned that Nobles Consort Chun was responsible for her late mistress's suicide, and was torturing another friend and fellow maid of the late Empress. She decides once again to enter the Forbidden City and exact retribution on the evildoers.

In order to achieve her goal, Yingluo skillfully charms Qianlong, becoming part of his harem, and is bestowed a title. She quickly rises through the ranks, toppling her rivals including Noble Consort Chun, and exposing her role in Empress Fuca's death, which leads to her death at the hands of the newly named Empress Hoifa-Nara. Yingluo's captivation of Qianlong brings her numerous threats, especially that of her former sworn brother Yuan Chunwang. At Empress Hoifa-Nara's direction, he reveals Yingluo is secretly taking birth control, revealing her true reason for entering the harem. Qianlong, who has fallen for her, instantly brands her out of favor.

Yingluo teams up with the Empress Dowager, whose own relationship with Qianlong has been put to the test because the Empress, who revealed that Qianlong was not the biological son of the Empress Dowager, but the offspring of Lady Qian, a Han Chinese consort of the late Emperor Yongzheng who had died under mysterious circumstances. It is implied that the Empress Dowager had killed Lady Qian out of jealousy for having a son and adopted Qianlong for herself for this reason. The two women once most dear to Qianlong go into self-imposed exile, leading to Qianlong feeling guilty for doubting his adoptive mother, who undeniably was the one who raised him for years.

A few years later, another threat in the form of newcomer Concubine Shun, a beautiful and cunning woman, calls Yingluo back to the Forbidden City. Yingluo sets out to reclaim Qianlong's favor, but finds herself befriended by her rival. But Concubine Shun has her own agenda. Framing Yingluo for attempted assassination, she teams up with Empress Hoifa-Nara to put Yingluo under house arrest. Nevertheless, Yingluo is able to reverse her situation, reveal Concubine Shun's treachery, and reclaim Qianlong's affections for her. Around the same time, Yingluo is discovered to be pregnant with Qianlong's child, much to the Emperor's happiness. Having reached stalemate at this point, Yingluo negotiates for a truce with the Empress on the condition that they both not harm any children of the palace in spite of the rivalry.

Yingluo, who also raises Fifth Prince Yongqi, goes on to bear two daughters and two sons over the next ten years, but one of her sons dies in infancy, and her health also slowly deteriorates.

A decade later, however, Yuan Chunwang, now Empress Hoifa-Nara's trusted servant, betrays his new mistress by causing a series of mishaps in the palace that destabilize her rule and affect her sanity. Yuan Chunwang gradually uses Prince He's, the Qianlong's half-brother, affection for the Empress to instigate a rebellion. They plot to sabotage the Southern river tour in order to seize power and, in Prince He's mind, free Empress Hoifa-Nara from her eroding position. One night, a band of rebels suddenly storms onto the royal vessel just as a fire engulfs the Empress Dowager's cabin, prompting Qianlong to charge into the flames to save his mother, seemingly perishing in the process.

The next morning, as Prince He gallantly appears to restore order from the overnight coup, Qianlong and the Empress Dowager emerge safely from a secret passageway designed by Fuheng and expose the plan of treachery. As it turns out, Prince He is betrayed by the Empress, who always loved Qianlong and wanted to use the rebellion to prove her devotion to her husband. Just then, Yingluo comes out of hiding under the protection of the Emperor's guards, the only consort to receive protection. This clear favoritism after all her years of devotion drives Empress Hoifa-Nara mad. In a fit of jealous rage, she cuts off her hair, a taboo in Manchu tradition, effectively cursing the entire Aisin Gioro clan.

After Qianlong sentences Prince He to confinement and the Empress is dragged away, Yuan Chunwang proclaims his innocence, only for Yingluo to reveal the real reason Yuan hated Qianlong so much. Yuan believed he was an illegitimate son of the late Yongzheng Emperor, because of the clothes belonging to Yongzheng that were left behind to his family. The Empress Dowager loudly denies this and claimed that he was an offspring of a bandit who killed Qianlong's birth mother Lady Qian and later raped Yuan Chunwang's mother, and asserted that the clothes belonged to Yongzheng were the same ones Lady Qian exchanged with Yongzheng and wore to distract the bandits. Her pity for his "wasted life", which she said Yuan Chunwang would have used to spend as a commoner who could marry and have kids, drives Yuan Chunwang, who instead was misled by a lie and thus chose to be castrated and enter the Forbidden City for revenge, into madness. Although Qianlong desired to execute the now insane Yuan Chunwang by lingchi for his crimes, the Empress Dowager however, suddenly asks for the emperor to spare him. When he protests, the Empress Dowager tells him to trust her this one time and it is implied that the she was lying about Yuan Chunwang's backstory to maintain peace in the family. Yuan Chunwang is banished to the hard labor department for life, never recovering his sanity.

Back when Wei Yingluo was being punished to work in the hard labor department, the then Consort Xian had saved her life by ordering an Imperial Physician to attend to her after she collapsed from illness. To repay this kindness from long ago, Wei Yingluo pleads for leniency for Empress Hoifa-Nara, and she is permitted to keep her title, but loses her managerial authority in the imperial harem and all of the Emperor's affections. Prince He is given poisoned wine by the Emperor, who orders him to go back to his palace after drinking it to make it look like he died of an illness. With Prince He executed for his crimes, Wei Yingluo's revenge for her sister is finally complete.

She is elevated to the highest rank  of the imperial women, "Imperial Noble Consort" (second in rank only to the Empress) and given the authority to manage the imperial harem.

Cast

Main

 Wu Jinyan as Wei Yingluo, (Imperial) (Noble) Consort Ling (令)
 Embroidery Maid → Maid at Changchun Palace → Maid at the workhouse → Maid at Changchun Palace → Maid at Yuanming Garden → Noble Lady Wei → Concubine Ling → Consort Ling → Noble Consort Ling → Imperial Noble Consort Ling → Empress Xiaoyichun (posthumously)
 An upright, strong and cunning woman who is ahead of her time in terms of knowledge and reasoning. She enters the palace to investigate the murder of her sister. Here, she uses her innate skills to rise above the tangles of conventional palace rivalries and defeat her enemies.
 Charmaine Sheh as Hoifa-Nara Shushen, Consort Xian (娴)
 Consort Xian → Noble Consort Xian → Imperial Noble Consort Xian → Step Empress Nara
 The second Empress of the Qianlong Emperor, initially a kind-hearted woman who desires only peace, she soon realizes that her kindness only results in her being stepped on. After her family's demise, she becomes a cunning woman who manipulates others for her own ends.
 Qin Lan as Fuca Rongyin, Empress Xiaoxianchun
 The first Empress of the Qianlong Emperor. Kind, gentle and virtuous. She mentors Yingluo while the latter serves in Changchun Palace, since she cares deeply for Yingluo.
 Nie Yuan as Aisin-Gioro Hongli, Qianlong Emperor
 The fifth Emperor of the Qing Dynasty, who rules sternly but justly. He loves Empress Fuca very much but, he will be one of the cause of her demise. He place Wei Yingluo in his Imperial Harem.
 Xu Kai as Fuca Fuheng
 Leader of the imperial guards and younger brother of Empress Fuca Rongyin. Due to his good looks and outstanding reputation, Fuheng is enormously popular among the various palace women. 
 Tan Zhuo as Gao Ningxin, Noble Consort Gao
Noble Consort Gao → Imperial Noble Consort Huixian (posthumously)
 The highest-ranked consort of the Qianlong Emperor, after the Empress. Her palace strategy can be summed up as "the best defence is a strong offence." Noble Consort Gao is ruthless, sly and manipulative. She will do anything just to make Empress Fuca, Consort Xian and the imperial women who dares to oppose her to suffer.

Supporting

Qianlong's harem

 Wang Yuanke as Su Jinghao, Consort Chun (纯)
 Consort Chun → Noble Consort Chun → Second Attendant Su
 Described as gentle, sophisticated, and talented by many, she is actually a supremely intelligent schemer. She initially acts as the loyal lackey and confidant of Empress Fuca, going so far as to deliberately avoid the Emperor's favour. Later, it is revealed that she was in love with Fuca Fuheng and that due to the machinations of her maid, she misunderstood his actions as returning her affections but being unable to act on them. The revelation of the truth turns her into a scorned woman. Due to her humiliation, regret, and Hoifa-Nara Shushen's sly instigations, she becomes ruthless on her quest for the Emperor's affections and power struggle to ensure her son becomes favored.
 Jenny Zhang as Niohuru Chenbi, Concubine Shun (顺)
 Gifted to Emperor Qianlong as a diplomatic gesture by a Qing vassal state. She has the face of pure innocence and the heart of a shrew.
 Lian Lian as Keliyete Ayan, Noble Lady Yu (愉)
 Noble Lady Yu → Concubine Yu → Consort Yu → Nun
 Mother of Qianlong's fifth son Yongqi. Timid and cowardly, she remains reticent about the abuse she suffers until Yingluo comes to her protection. In time, she learns to be quite machiavellian as she sacrifices herself and takes down Yingluo's rival, Noble Consort Chun.
 Xu Baihui as Lady Huang, Concubine Yi (怡)
 The closest friend of Noble Lady Yu. An early victim of Noble Consort Gao.
 Pan Shiqi as Lady Jin, Concubine Jia (嘉) and Lady Jin, Noble Lady Jia
 Concubine Jia → Noble Lady Jia → Second Attendant Jin
 Noble Lady Jia → Concubine Jia → Consort Jia
 Two sisters, of whom the younger enters the palace sometime after the older. The older sister is an underling of Noble Consort Gao and mother of the 4th Prince. To survive, she does Gao's dirty work and is there to take the fall for her. Her younger sister later enters the harem with a strong distaste for Yingluo and does not get very far.
 Li Chun'ai as Nalan Chunxue, Noble Lady Shu (舒)
 Noble Lady Shu → Concubine Shu → Consort Shu
 One of the harem women who is handled by Yingluo early on and over the course of the series becomes comic relief.
 Li Ruoning as Lu Wanwan, First Attendant Qing (庆)
 First Attendant Qing → Noble Lady Qing → Concubine Qing → Consort Qing → Noble Consort Qing
 Quiet but self-assured, she is a reserved person who can nevertheless effect big changes. She becomes Wei Yingluo's trusted ally and raises the 15th Prince, Yongyan.
 Liu Lu as Lady Baarin, Noble Lady Ying (颖)
 Noble Lady Ying → Concubine Ying → Consort Ying
 A well-informed lady with good intentions, who is a conformist.
 Wang Xinhui as Lady Chen, Concubine Wan (婉)
 Fu Xiaoyu as Lady Socoro, Noble Lady Rui (瑞)

Female servants

 Su Qing as Hitara Erqing
 First maid to Empress Fuca → Madam Fuca
 An opportunist who will not let morals get in the way of ambition, Erqing is initially well-regarded as the Empress’s most trusted maid. She later marries Fuca Fuheng but struggles with her husband’s disinterest and hostility and resorts to ever more drastic measures. Loosely based on Princess Consort Yehe-Nara, wife of Fuca Fuheng.
 Jiang Zixin as Mingyu
 Second maid to Empress Fuca → First Maid to Empress Fuca → Maid to Noble Consort Chun → First maid to Consort Ling
 Outspoken but dim, she is unreservedly loyal to Empress Fuca, and later becomes Yingluo's reliable friend and co-conspirator.
 Fang Anna as Zhen'er
 First maid of Consort Xian.
 Shi Yufei as Zhilan
 First maid of Noble Consort Gao. 
 Chen Mo as Yuhu
 First maid of Consort Chun.
 Ren Wanjing as Fangcao
 First maid of Noble Lady Yu.
 Qian Chenjie as Ah'shuang
 First maid of the elder Concubine Jia.
 Liu Shitong as Lan’er
 First maid of the younger Noble Lady Jia
 Gao Rui as Bailing
 First maid of Dowager Imperial Noble Consort Yu.
 Zhang Jie as Yizhu
 First maid of Concubine Shun.
 Li Jiawei as Palace Maid Liu
 First maid to Empress Dowager Chongqing.
 Zhang Yixi as Jixiang
 Yingluo's first friend in the embroidery unit. Dies after being tricked by Linglong.
 Gao Yu'er as Jinxiu
 Jealous rival of Yingluo in the embroidery unit, who is later punished to hard labor. In the workhouse she tries to catch the attention of Yuan Chunwang.
 Chen Ruoxi as Linglong
 Another rival of Yingluo at the embroidery unit. She is sent to Ningguta because of a stray needle in the Emperor's robe.
 He Jiayi as Supervisor Zhang
 Head of the embroidery unit and Yingluo's first mentor at the palace.
 Yin Xu as Fang Nizi
 Second head of the embroidery unit who hates Yingluo. She is banished after attempting to frame Yingluo for having an affair with a guard. It is revealed that she had stolen Yingning's personal items.
 Zhang Tingting as Supervisor Liu
 Head of workhouse. Pawn of the consorts in the schemes against Yingluo. Had her tongue cut.
 Deng Sha as Wei Yingning
 Yingluo's deceased older sister. While in the embroidery unit her name was changed to A'man to avoid naming taboo (as "ning" sounds similar to a character in Noble Consort Gao's personal name, Ningxin). Yingning dies mysteriously and suddenly and Yingluo enters the palace to investigate Yingning’s death.
 Yang Jingru as Hupo
 Maid at Empress Fuca's Palace. She resents Yingluo for entering the harem and is punished to hard labor for her disrespect. Eventually reveals what drove Empress Fuca to her death.
 Zhang Tianyun as Zhenzhu
 Maid at Empress Fuca's Palace. She later becomes Yingluo’s maid and remains extremely loyal to her.
 An An as Manao
 Maid at Empress Fuca's Changchun Palace.
 Zhao Mengjie as Feicui
 Maid at Empress Fuca's Changchun Palace. Later, she serves in the Empress's Immortal Room in the Forbidden City.

Male servants

 Lawrence Wong as Suolun Hailancha
 Imperial guard and best friend of Fuca Fuheng. Hailancha falls in love with Mingyu.
 Liu Enshang as Li Yu
 Head eunuch and loyal servant of the Qianlong Emperor. He can read his master by his countenance and does not mind being the butt (literally) of his aggression.
 Chang Cheng as Desheng
 Junior eunuch and assistant to Li Yu.
 Wang Maolei as Yuan Chunwang
 Palace eunuch. A mysterious person with a wicked mind. He believes that he and Yingluo are two of a kind, and will do whatever it takes to make her see it his way, whether or not she wants to.
 Zheng Long as Xiao Quanzi 
 One of Yingluo's eunuchs, who has a dubious reputation.
 Sun Di as Wu Shulai
 Eunuch supervisor of the inner courts.
 Tan Xuqi as Cigiya Qingxi
A royal guard and acquaintance of Yingning, whom Yingluo initially suspects of involvement in Yingning’s death. He later attempts to frame Yingluo for seducing him.
 Yong Yi as Doctor Ye Tianshi
 A talented travelling physician who becomes an imperial doctor.
 Wu Lihua as Imperial Doctor Zhang
 One of the imperial doctors who cares for the emperor, his harem and children.

Imperial Family

 Wang Huichun as Aisin-Gioro Yinzhen, Yongzheng Emperor
 Father to the Qianlong Emperor. Deceased and only seen in flashbacks.
 Ma Chunyan as Lady Ula-Nara, Empress Xiaojingxian
The Yongzheng Emperor’s Empress and thus a stepmother to the Qianlong Emperor. She chose Fuca Rongyin for him. Deceased and only seen in flashbacks.
 Song Chunli as Lady Niohuru, Empress Dowager Chongqing
 Former Consort of the Yongzheng Emperor, who raised Emperor Qianlong. As Qianlong’s mother she has become Empress Dowager upon Qianlong’s accession. A pious Buddhist who prizes a stable empire above all and actively pursues a stable harem, but also a force to be reckoned with. 
 Fang Yangfei as Aisin-Gioro Yongcheng, Prince Lü of the First Rank
 Fourth Prince, son of Emperor Qianlong and the elder Concubine Jia. Raised by Empress Hoifa-Nara.
 Chen Youwei as Aisin-Gioro Yongqi, Prince Rong of the First Rank
 Fifth Prince, son of Emperor Qianlong and Noble Lady Yu. Raised by Consort Ling. Potential candidate for the throne due to his many talents.
 Zhou Yicheng as Aisin-Gioro Yongcong, Prince Zhe of the First Rank (哲)
 Seventh Prince, son of Emperor Qianlong and Empress Fuca. Yongcong dies at a young age in raging flames.
 Tang Jiatong as Aisin-Gioro Yongyan, Prince Jia of the First Rank
 Fifteenth Prince, son of Emperor Qianlong and Noble Consort Ling. Raised by Consort Qing. Goes on to become the Jiaqing Emperor.
 Wang Herun as Aisin-Gioro Zhaohua, Princess Hejing of the First Rank
 Seventh Princess, daughter of Emperor Qianlong and Noble Consort Ling. Raised by the Empress Dowager.
 Bai Shan as Lady Geng, Dowager Noble Consort Yu (裕)
 Former consort of the Yongzheng Emperor and mother of Hongzhou, Prince He. Regarded as a pious and devout Buddhist.
 Hong Yao as Aisin-Gioro Hongzhou, Prince He of the First Rank
 Half-brother of the Qianlong Emperor. Puts on an apathetic, foolhardy demeanor to conceal his ambition and lifelong disappointment of being second to Qianlong.
 Cheng Junwen as Aisin-Gioro Hongxiao, Prince Yi of the First Rank
 Cousin of Emperor Qianlong. Collaborates with Noble Consort Gao against Yingluo and Empress Hoifa-Nara before he is sent to the Imperial Clan Court for adding salt to the sacrificial meat.
 Gong Fangmin as Aisin-Gioro Yuntao, Prince Lü of the First Rank
 The Yongzheng Emperor's half-brother who is critical of Prince He's behavior.

Production
Many of the film props and costumes are exquisitely made using traditional Chinese crafts that are dying out with few master-level experts remaining to pass on their skills to the next generation. The acquisition of these skills requires a lifetime commitment to perfect, since they are unsurprisingly labor-intensive, demanding a sharp eye and tireless hands in order to replicate in painstaking detail the exclusive nature of their beauty.

Velvet flowers (ronghua) 
The velvet flower headwear used by the main characters was designed based on historical documents or antiques housed in the Palace Museum. Each adornment is created according to the characteristics of individual palace women. Zhao Shuxian, one of the few craftsmen still making velvet flowers, created all the headwear in the show using the art of making velvet flower (ronghua). This technique dates back to the Tang Dynasty (618–907) and refers to the creation of not only floral displays, but also animal shapes made of silk on a twisted wire frame.

Jeweled hairpins (tian-tsui) 
Worn by the Empress and Consorts as status symbols of opulence, these are hairpins of a particular vibrant blue hue, made from the preserved feathers of the wings and back of the kingfisher bird. The technique resembles cloisonné, and when inlaid with pearls and other gemstones, the jewels are especially eye-catching the way a peacock dazzles fanning its tail.

Soundtrack

The original soundtrack was released as an extended play on July 23, 2018. "Willows of the Palace" by Li Chunai was released independently from the album.

A 70-track studio album titled The Story of Yanxi Palace TV soundtrack (延禧攻略 影视剧配乐) was released July 19, 2018, containing the instrumental music of the series composed by Chen Guoliang. The music was recorded in J Productions House, and features flute player: Tan Baoshuo, Violin player: Leslie Ryang, Pipa player: Liu Tuotong, erhu player: Huang Leting, and Li Junzhu as the female voice. A total of 129 pieces were used in the show.

In the Philippines, "Aahon" sung by JMKO was released under ABS-CBN Star Music and was the show's theme song.

Reception
The series has generated buzz online for its engaging plot of a "Cinderella" tale with Chinese characteristics. It set the single-day online viewership record in China with a total of 530 million views, and has attracted a cumulative over 13 billion views since August 2018. The drama is the most viewed Chinese language drama of 2018.

It was also the most Googled show on earth in 2018, despite Google being blocked in the mainland.

Many viewers praised the story, because unlike the amicable heroines they were used to seeing, the main character Wei Yingluo fights fire with fire and outmaneuvers her opponents. It also received praise for its well-developed characters and exciting interpretation by the actors, beautiful cinematography and intricate costume design, as well as its accurate portrayal of history and Qing-dynasty settings. Owing to its success, there has been an increased number of visitors to the Palace Museum in Beijing, which is where all the main characters in the show used to live in times gone by.

Ratings 

 Highest ratings are marked in red, lowest ratings are marked in blue

Controversy
There was uproar in China after a Vietnamese website managed to acquire episodes not yet shown in China and asked visitors to the website to answer questions confirming their Vietnamese identity before the website loads. "This service is for Vietnamese people only. Please answer the following questions: To which country do the Hoàng Sa Islands (Paracel Islands) belong? Vietnam, China, Philippines or Japan?". The only correct answer to the question is "Vietnam". Copies of the episodes were later removed from the platform.

Censorship 
On January 25, 2019, the Beijing Daily, an official government newspaper, criticized the program for failing to promote socialist values. Four days later, on January 29, the Chinese government cancelled the program and similar programs such as Ruyi's Royal Love in the Palace. CNN and other media outlets quickly reported on this incident, calling it Chinese censorship. A Hong Kong professor stated that the show was censored because it became too popular and defied social norms.

Awards and nominations

Sequel
On December 31, 2019, Netflix released a six-episode season, "Yanxi Palace: Princess Adventures", which covers the marriage of Imperial Consort Ling's daughter, Princess Zhaohua, played by Wang Herun.

References

External links
 
  (The spinoff and sequel)

2018 Chinese television series debuts
2018 Chinese television series endings
2018 web series debuts
Chinese historical television series
Chinese web series
IQIYI original programming
Television series by Huanyu Film
Television series set in the Qing dynasty
Television shows based on Chinese novels